Sumera Shams is a Pakistani politician who was elected as a member of the Khyber Pakhtunkhwa Assembly in July 20.

Early life
Her younger sister Noreena Shams has represented Pakistan in  International squash event.

Political career
Shams was elected as the member of the Khyber Pakhtunkhwa Assembly on a ticket of Pakistan Tehreek-e-Insaf from Lower Dir District in the provincial election held in July 2018.

She is the youngest person to be elected as a Member of the Provincial Assembly. She was also one of the first women to cast a vote in Lower Dir.

Previously she served as a district councillor in Lower Dir in 2015.

Shams was named a 2022 Politician of the Year by One Young World, receiving her award in Manchester, England in September 2022 alongside four other young politicians from around the world.

References

External links
 Sumaira Shams | KP Assembly
 

Living people
Pakistan Tehreek-e-Insaf MPAs (Khyber Pakhtunkhwa)
Women members of the Provincial Assembly of Khyber Pakhtunkhwa
1991 births